John Lyons was an Irish politician. He was elected to Dáil Éireann as a Labour Party Teachta Dála (TD) for the Longford–Westmeath constituency at the 1922 general election. He was re-elected as an independent Labour TD at the 1923 general election. He did not contest the June 1927 general election and was an unsuccessful candidate at the September 1927 general election. He lived at Newtown, Moate, County Westmeath.

References

Year of birth missing
Year of death missing
Labour Party (Ireland) TDs
Members of the 3rd Dáil
Members of the 4th Dáil
Independent TDs